Maricruz Mangue Oburu Nchama (born 6 March 1986), sportingly known as Pachu, is an Equatorial Guinean footballer who plays as a left back for Spanish Aragon Segunda Femenina club El Gancho CF and the Equatorial Guinea women's national team.

Club career
Pachu started with Estrellas de E'Waiso Ipola in the Equatoguinean women's football league. She moved to Leones Vegetarianos FC in 2018. She joined Spanish team El Ejido in the winter of 2019.

International career
Pachu made her international debut for Equatorial Guinea on 26 November 2017, coming on as a second-half substitute in a 4–0 home friendly win against Comoros.

References

1986 births
Living people
Equatoguinean women's footballers
Women's association football fullbacks
CD El Ejido (women) players
Equatorial Guinea women's international footballers
Equatoguinean expatriate women's footballers
Equatoguinean expatriate sportspeople in Spain
Expatriate women's footballers in Spain